Hoopers Creek is an unincorporated community and census-designated place (CDP) in Henderson County, North Carolina, United States. Its population was 1,056 as of the 2010 census.

Geography
The community is in northern Henderson County, bordered to the west by the town of Fletcher and to the north by Buncombe County. The CDP is in the valley of Hoopers Creek, a west-flowing tributary of Cane Creek and part of the French Broad River watershed. The  summit of Burney Mountain is on the northern border of the CDP, and  Bank Mountain is on the southern border.

Demographics

Notes

Census-designated places in North Carolina
Census-designated places in Henderson County, North Carolina
Unincorporated communities in North Carolina
Unincorporated communities in Henderson County, North Carolina